Luis Barrancos Álvarez (born August 19, 1946 in Santa Cruz de la Sierra) is a retired Bolivian football referee. He is known for having refereed one match in the 1982 FIFA World Cup in Spain between Argentina and El Salvador.

Barrancos is known to have served as a FIFA referee during the period from 1975 to 1987. He officiated at the 1979 and 1987 Copa America tournaments, as well as qualifying matches for the 1978, 1982, and 1986 World Cups.

Barrancos was a panelist at CONMEBOL's 'Futuro III' referee's conference in Buenos Aires in May 2008.

References

Profile

1946 births
Sportspeople from Santa Cruz de la Sierra
Bolivian football referees
FIFA World Cup referees
Copa América referees
Living people
1982 FIFA World Cup referees